Ablex Publishing Corporation is a privately held publisher of books and academic journals in New York City, New York, USA. It was previously located in Norwood, New Jersey, and also at one time in Westport and Stamford, Connecticut. Ablex publishes edited volumes, monographs, research journals, and textbooks, focused on communication, education, library science, psychology, and technology. In 1997, Ablex became an affiliate company of JAI Press, a subsidiary of Elsevier Science, the world's largest publisher of medical and scientific literature.

Partial list of titles and imprints
 Ablex Communication, Culture & Information Series
 Ablex series in computational science
 Ablex series in software engineering 
 Ablex series in artificial intelligence, Jerry Hobbs, editor
 Ablex Theoretical Issues in Cognitive Science
 Advances in Human-Computer Interaction
 Cognitive development
 Cognitive science: journal of the Cognitive Science Society
 Early Childhood Research Quarterly
 International Journal of Bilingualism
 Linguistics and education: an international research journal
 National Women's Studies Association Journal
 New directions in computers and composition studies
 The David C. Anchin series in social and policy issues in education

References

External links
 Library and information science research titles of Ablex

International distributors
Mexico:
 Books Suppliers, S.A. de C.V.

Magazine publishing companies of the United States
Book publishing companies based in New York (state)